Anya Monzikova (born August 25, 1984) is a Russian-American model and actress.

Early life
Monzikova was born in Vologda, Russian SFSR, Soviet Union. She lived in Russia up to the age of eight, when she moved to Florida. After she graduated from high school, she moved again to Los Angeles to pursue a career in acting.  She currently is studying Wushu and taking stunt classes, so she can do her own stunts when she stars in an action movie. She is a naturalized US citizen.

Career
In 2006, she became a model on NBC's hit game show, Deal or No Deal holding case #10. However, in the "Big Money Week" in season 1 she held case #19. She had the role until the end of the show in 2009.

In 2007, Monzikova played the angel character from the painting "The Wounded Angel" in the music video Amaranth, the second single from Dark Passion Play, the album of Finnish metal band Nightwish.

Monzikova is featured in a photo shoot in the August 2007 issue of Stuff magazine. She is also on the cover of Runway Magazine along with seven other Deal or No Deal models with a feature inside.

In 2008, she played Jessica Jaynes in the CSI: Crime Scene Investigation episode "Drop's Out".

She was also featured for television commercials for the product "Skinit", a line of customizable phone covers. She appeared in the 2009 movie Surrogates, where she was credited as "Beautiful Woman".  She had a guest starring role, Ivana Alexandrovna, in Knight Rider. Monzikova played Rebeka in the 2010 film Iron Man 2.

In 2011, Monzikova played Sarah in the Syfy/The Asylum film Zombie Apocalypse. In 2012, she played Elena Romanova in the ABC Family show Melissa & Joey.

References

External links

Anya at Deal or No Deal

1984 births
Russian emigrants to the United States
American female models
Game show models
Living people
People from Vologda
American wushu practitioners
Russian female models
21st-century American women